Interstate 135 (I-135) is an approximately  auxiliary Interstate Highway in central and south-central Kansas, United States. I-135, which is signed as north–south, runs between I-35 and the Kansas Turnpike in Wichita north to I-70, U.S. Highway 40 (US-40), and US-81 in Salina. Except for the first , I-135 overlaps US-81 its entire length. The route also runs through the cities of McPherson, Newton, and Park City.

The highway was designated as Interstate 35W (I-35W) until September 1976, when it was renumbered as I-135 to conform to new AASHTO policies that eliminated most suffixed Interstate Highways. It is the longest three-digit "spur", with an odd first digit, in the Interstate System until the completion of I-369 in Texas.

In 2021, work began to rebuild the northern junction with I-235.

Route description

I-135 begins from the south at exit 42 on the Kansas Turnpike. (The exit is signed as I-135/I-235/US-81 for Wichita and Salina.) US-81 joins I-135  later at exit 1A (East 47th Street South) and remains concurrent with it for the rest of its length. I-135 continues northward from there, running just east of the Wichita downtown area. It reunites with I-235 at exits 11A and 11B at milepost 11 at the loop's other end.

I-135 leaves Wichita and continues northward to Newton where it turns northwest around milemarker 33.

The stretch of I-135 in Saline County from the Saline–McPherson county line to the highway's terminus at I-70, is designated as the Ben E. Vidricksen Highway, in honor of a state senator who was active in pushing for the highway's enlargement.

The route ends on the northwest side of Salina, at its intersection at I-70. The road continues as US-81 north of this interchange.

History

Construction on the Canal Route portion of I-135 (in Wichita, where the Chisholm Creek Canal runs through the median of the highway) was begun in 1971. This portion of the route took eight years to complete with a cost of $32 million (equivalent to $ in ). It was built through the middle of the city's African-American neighborhood, known as McAdams.

Originally, the northern terminus of the highway at I-70 ended as a trumpet interchange. When US-81 was upgraded to a freeway between Salina and Minneapolis, Kansas, the northern terminus was rebuilt as a full cloverleaf interchange, which remains to this day.

Until September 13, 1976, I-135 was signed as Interstate 35W (I-35W). The Interstate's full length was completed in December 1979.

In 2021, work began to rebuild the northern junction with I-235.

Exit list

References

External links

 Kansas Highway Maps: Current, Historic, KDOT
 I-135 at Kurumi.com
 I-135 at AARoads

35-1
35-1
1
Salina, Kansas
Transportation in Wichita, Kansas
Transportation in Sedgwick County, Kansas
Transportation in Harvey County, Kansas
Transportation in McPherson County, Kansas
Transportation in Saline County, Kansas